Winifred Mason Shaw (later Mrs. Wooldridge) (18 January 1947 – 30 March 1992) was a professional tennis player from Scotland whose career ran from the mid-1960s until the early 70s. In 2002, she posthumously was inducted into the Scottish Sports Hall of Fame.

Personal life
Winnie Shaw was born in Glasgow on 18 January 1947, the second and youngest child of Winifred Mason, also a tennis player who was Scottish national champion in 1930 and 1933, and journalist Angus Shaw.

Career
Shaw was a three-time winner of the Scottish Grass Court Championships in 1965, 1966 and 1970, three-time runner-up in the Scottish Hard Court Championships and twice runner-up in the British Hard Court Championships. In Grand Slam events, her best progress was reaching the Australian Open semifinals in 1970 and 1971, and the Wimbledon quarterfinals in the same seasons.

In doubles events, Shaw reached the finals of both the mixed doubles (1971) and the ladies doubles (1972) at the French Open. She also made it to the ladies doubles semifinals at the US Open and Australian Open on two occasions each, and to the semifinal at Wimbledon in 1972, playing with another player from Scotland, Joyce Williams.

She represented Great Britain in the Wightman Cup and the Federation Cup teams between 1966 and 1972.

Golf
After her marriage in 1972 she became a keen golfer. She played for Scotland in the 1982 Women's Home Internationals. Shaw reached the semi-finals of the Scottish Women's Amateur Championship in 1980 and 1982. In 1981, partnered by Belle Robertson, she won the Avia Foursomes with a score of 309, a stroke ahead of the runners-up.

Retirement
She married English tennis player Keith Wooldridge in October 1972 and retired as a tennis player after the 1978 edition of Wimbledon. She died on 30 March 1992 from a brain tumour.

Grand Slam finals

Doubles (1 runner-up)

Mixed doubles (1 runner-up)

References

External links
 
 
 
 Winifred Mason Wooldridge (nee Shaw) at the Scottish Sports Hall of Fame

British female tennis players
Scottish female tennis players
Sportspeople from Glasgow
1947 births
1992 deaths
Deaths from brain tumor
People from Clarkston, East Renfrewshire
People educated at Hutchesons' Grammar School
Sportspeople from East Renfrewshire
Scottish female golfers
Amateur golfers